Ktav or KTAV may refer to:

 KTAV-LD, a low-power television station (channel 21, virtual 35) licensed to serve Los Angeles, California, United States
 KTAV Publishing House, an American publisher of Judaica and Jewish educational texts
 Ktav Stam, certain specific Jewish traditional writing
 Cursive Hebrew